Gertrudis Laemers is a Dutch para table tennis player. She represented the Netherlands at the 1996 Summer Paralympics and at the 2000 Summer Paralympics and in total she won two bronze medals.

In 1996, she won the bronze medal in the Women's Singles 4 event. In 2000, she won the bronze medal in the Women's Teams 1-3 event together with Jolanda Paardekam.

References

External links 
 

Living people
Year of birth missing (living people)
Place of birth missing (living people)
Table tennis players at the 1996 Summer Paralympics
Table tennis players at the 2000 Summer Paralympics
Medalists at the 1996 Summer Paralympics
Medalists at the 2000 Summer Paralympics
Paralympic bronze medalists for the Netherlands
Paralympic athletes of the Netherlands
Paralympic table tennis players of the Netherlands
Dutch female table tennis players
Paralympic medalists in table tennis
20th-century Dutch women
21st-century Dutch women